William Brown is a Vancouver based, British academic, author and filmmaker of low and zero-budget films. He is most notable for his 2013 non-fiction book Supercinema.

Education and academic career 
Brown obtained his Ph.D. from the University of Oxford in 2007 and is a Senior Lecturer in Film at the University of Roehampton in London, UK. He previously taught at the University of St Andrews.

Publications

Books 
He is the author of the 2013 philosophy non-fiction book Supercinema: Film-Philosophy for the Digital Age and co-author the 2010 book Moving People, Moving Images: Cinema and Trafficking in the New Europe which influenced in Paul Virilio's 2016 book Drone Age Cinema.

Bloomsbury published his 2018 book Non-Cinema: Global Digital Filmmaking and the Multitude.

He is also the co-author of The Squid Cinema from Hell: Kinoteuthis Infernalis and the Emergence of Chthulumedia (Bloomsbury, 2018).

Book chapters 

 Amateur Digital Filmmaking and Capitalism, chapter of Marx at the Movies, 2014, Palgrave Macmillan, ISBN 978-1137378606

Films 
Brown has made seven zero-budget or micro-budget films through his film company Beg Steal Borrow:

 En Attendant Godart (Sight & Sound Films of the Year 2009)
 Afterimages (Sight & Sound Films of the Year 2010)
 Common Ground (Fest Film Festival 2013; American Online Film Awards Spring Showcase 2014)
 China: A User's Manual (FILMS) (2012)
 Selfie (2014)
 Ur: The End of Civilization in 90 Tableaux (2015)
 The New Hope (2015)

References 

21st-century English writers
Alumni of the University of Oxford
Academics of the University of Roehampton
Academics of the University of St Andrews
English experimental filmmakers
Living people
Year of birth missing (living people)
Place of birth missing (living people)